Beyond Imagining: Margaret Anderson and the 'Little Review' is a 1992 American short documentary film about Margaret Caroline Anderson, produced by Wendy L. Weinberg. It was nominated for an Academy Award for Best Documentary Short.

References

External links
 Beyond Imagining: Margaret Anderson and the 'Little Review' at Women Make Movies
 

1992 short films
1992 films
1990s short documentary films
American short documentary films
American independent films
Documentary films about women
Documentary films about the arts
1992 documentary films
Works about magazine publishing
1992 independent films
1990s English-language films
1990s American films